The Stadionul Ion Oblemenco is a football stadium in Craiova, Romania. The all-seater stadium opened in 2017 and has a capacity of 30,983, the fourth largest football ground in Romania. It is in the immediate vicinity of the new Sala Polivalentă. The ground is named after Ion Oblemenco (1945–1996), a legendary player and coach of Universitatea Craiova.

The stadium ranked fourth overall among stadiums in the world opened in 2017 surpassing expectations, ranking higher than Wanda Metropolitano and Gazprom Arena. On 26 February, 2018, the Stadionul Ion Oblemenco was selected as a finalist from 27 submissions by the jury. Architects generally agreed that the outcome was satisfying, with decent investment results.

History
Construction began on September 7, 2015. The older stadium was demolished in the same year. On 26 April, 2017, the construction reached its final phase, with seats being installed.

To celebrate the opening of the stadium, Universitatea Craiova played a friendly on 10 November, 2017 against the Czech side Slavia Prague. A crowd of 30,000 people attended.

The stadium officially opened with a ceremony on 18 November, 2017 before its first competitive senior game, the Liga I match against Juventus București. The match was won by Universitatea Craiova 3–1, with Alexandru Mitriță scoring the first ever official goal at the new stadium.

Events

International football games

Gallery

See also
List of football stadiums in Romania 
List of European stadia by capacity
Stade Vélodrome

References

2017 establishments in Romania
Buildings and structures in Craiova
Romania national football team
Football venues in Romania
CS Universitatea Craiova
Sport in Craiova